Sportsplay was an Australian satellite television service that operated from 1985 to 1987. 

Sportsplay was one of three Australian satellite hotel television channels that emerged following the launch of the Aussat A1 satellite, and was owned by Powerplay International, then-owners of football league team Sydney Swans. Sportsplay commenced transmissions from their Sydney studios on the 1st of December 1986, with programming consisting largely of harness racing and greyhound racing from around Australia, distributed exclusively to hotels and clubs. 

Financial troubles, losing the hotel market share to rivals Sky Channel plus a failed attempt to apply for broadcasting rights to Australian VFL matches led to Sportsplay's downfall, with the station reporting losses of up to $1 million per month in 1987. After a failed attempt to float the company coupled with the stock market crash of 1987, Sportsplay was bought by Alan Bond and Bond Media, and was thus absorbed into Bond's Sky Channel in November 1987.

References 

Television channels and stations established in 1985
English-language television stations in Australia
Defunct television channels in Australia
Sports television networks in Australia